Herbert Edgar Haines (1880-1923) was a British composer of musicals and songs, including some pieces for silent films, in the early years of the 20th century.

Haines's musicals, most by Ben Dauphinais, with lyrics by Charles H. Taylor (lyricist), included The Catch of the Season (1904), The Talk of the Town (1905), The Beauty of Bath (1906), My Darling (1907), and Pebbles on the Beach (1912).

External links 
 Lists five musicals composed by Haines
 Discusses pieces written by Haines for silent films

English musical theatre composers
English male composers
1880 births
1923 deaths
20th-century British male musicians